Sphecomyia vespiformis is a species of syrphid fly in the family Syrphidae.

Distribution
Lithuania.

References

Eristalinae
Insects described in 1852
Diptera of Europe